Morrissey is a ghost town located in the East Kootenay region of British Columbia, Canada. The town is situated south of Fernie.

It was company town owned by a mining company, but the mine closed in 1909.  An Internment camp was set up at rented premises in Morrissey from June 1915 to October 1918.

References

Ghost towns in British Columbia
Internment camps in Canada
World War I sites in Canada
Mining communities in British Columbia